David Ray Boggs (born September 8, 1943) is an American stock car racing driver. Now retired, he is a former competitor in the NASCAR Grand American Series, the NASCAR Winston Cup Series, and the ARCA Racing Series.

NASCAR career 
Boggs made his debut in NASCAR competition in 1970, winning Rookie of the Year in the Grand American series. He moved up to the Winston Cup Series in 1971, making his debut at Bowman Gray Stadium and finishing ninth; he would compete in 32 races over three seasons, posting a best finish of sixth at Dover Downs International Speedway later that year. Boggs' Winston Cup career would be remembered most for a cut tire starting a wreck during the qualifying races for the 1972 Daytona 500 that resulted in the death of Friday Hassler. Boggs also competed in 11 races in the Grand National East Division in 1972 and 1973 with a best finish of fifth. Following his Winston Cup career, Boggs returned to North Carolina's short tracks, competing in late model stock cars.

Boggs returned to NASCAR competition in the Busch Series between 1983 and 1986, running three races with a best finish of 21st; In his final race in the series at North Carolina Motor Speedway he suffered broken legs in a crash. Boggs attempted a comeback in the series in 2002, attempting to qualify for the season-opening race at Daytona International Speedway, but failed to make the race.

ARCA career 
Boggs made his debut in Automobile Racing Club of America competition in 1973, running five races that were co-sanctioned with the NASCAR Grand National East Series; after competing in a few events in the series in the late 1980s, he became a regular competitor in ARCA during the 1990s. His best finish, fifth, came in a rain-shortened race at Lowe's Motor Speedway in 2003. Boggs retired from competition following the 2007 season.

Motorsports career results

NASCAR 
(key) (Bold – Pole position awarded by qualifying time. Italics – Pole position earned by points standings or practice time. * – Most laps led.)

Grand National Series

Winston Cup Series

Daytona 500

Busch Series

ARCA Re/Max Series 
(key) (Bold – Pole position awarded by qualifying time. Italics – Pole position earned by points standings or practice time. * – Most laps led.)

References

External links 
 

Living people
1943 births
People from Morrisville, North Carolina
Racing drivers from North Carolina
NASCAR drivers
ARCA Menards Series drivers